Mehmood Ali (1932–2004) was an Indian actor, singer, director and producer known as Mehmood.

Mehmood Ali may also refer to:
 Mehmood Ali Family, his family, an Indian film family 
 Mehmood Ali (footballer), Pakistani footballer

See also
 Mahmud Ali (disambiguation)